Aforia kincaidi is a species of sea snail, a marine gastropod mollusk in the family Cochlespiridae.

Description
The height of the shell attains 29 mm, its diameter 13 mm.

(Original description) The waxen white shell is of moderate size and has a fusiform shape. The spire is acute. The siphonal canal is elongated. The protoconch consists  of two smooth bulbous whorls with five subsequent whorls. The axial sculpture shows only faint incremental lines. The spiral sculpture includes a very prominent thin sharp peripheral keel and fine spiral striae with wider interspaces, over most of the surface. The interspaces become more rounded and coarser on the base.  The entire space between the keel and the preceding suture may be said to form the anal fasciole, the wide arcuate sulcus being situated a little way in front of the suture. The base of the shell is neatly rounded and contracted at the beginning of the siphonal canal. The outer lip is thin, sharp and much produced in front. The inner lip is slightly erased. The columella is obliquely attenuated in front, gyrate, and with a minutely pervious axis. The siphonal canal is narrow and slender. The operculum is yellowish, ovate and has an apical nucleus.

Distribution
This marine species occurs off Alaska.

References

 Abbott R. T. (1974). American seashells. The marine Mollusca of the Atlantic and Pacific coast of North America. ed. 2. Van Nostrand, New York. 663 pp., 24 pls.

External links

kincaidi
Taxa named by William Healey Dall
Gastropods described in 1919